The 2013 LEB Oro promotion Playoffs is the final stage of the 2012–13 LEB Oro season. They will start on 26 April 2013, and they will finish on May 31 or June 2 or 4.

All the series will be played in a best-of-5 games format. The best seeded team plays at home the games 1, 2 and 5 if necessary. The winner of the playoffs will promote to 2013–14 ACB season with Ford Burgos, the champion of the regular season.

Bracket

Quarterfinals

River Andorra – Leyma Natura Básquet Coruña

Lucentum Alicante – Lobe Huesca

Palencia Baloncesto – Força Lleida CE

CB Breogán – Cáceres Patrimonio de la Humanidad

Semifinals

River Andorra – Cáceres Patrimonio de la Humanidad

Lucentum Alicante – Palencia Baloncesto

Final

River Andorra – Lucentum Alicante

References

LEB Oro playoffs
playoff